Frederick Pollard may refer to:

 Fred G. Pollard (1918–2003), American lawyer and  Virginian politician
 Fritz Pollard (1894–1986), American football player and coach
 Fritz Pollard, Jr. (1915–2003), American Olympic hurdler, son of Fritz Pollard